Change Partners is a 1965 British crime drama directed by Robert Lynn and starring Anthony Dawson, Zena Walker and Kenneth Cope. It was made at Merton Park Studios originally as a Warner-Pathé release, prior to being included as a part of the long-running series of Edgar Wallace Mysteries.

Plot
Ben Arkwright and (Cedric) Ricky Gallen are partners in the firm of Arkwright and Gallen; however, Ricky is having an affair with Ben's wife, Anna.

Anna talks Ricky into killing her alcoholic husband, but things do not go according to plan.

Cast
Anthony Dawson as Ben Arkwright
Zena Walker as Anna Arkwright
Basil Henson as (Cedric) Ricky Gallen
Kenneth Cope as Joe Trent
Jane Barrett as Betty Gallen
Pamela Ann Davy as Jean
Peter Bathurst as McIvor
Graham Ashley as Police Constable
Josephine Pritchard as Sally Morrison
James Watts as Waiter
Vivien Lloyd as Secretary

References

External links
Film page at BFI

1965 films
British crime drama films
1965 crime drama films
Edgar Wallace Mysteries
British black-and-white films
1960s English-language films
1960s British films